The Hope College Pull (The Pull) is an annual tug-of-war contest held across the Black River in Holland, Michigan on the fourth Saturday after Labor Day at 3:00 PM. It is sponsored by Hope College and is one of the nation's oldest standing college traditions. Competitors are 40 members of both the Freshman and Sophomore Class. The freshman team is coached by juniors while the sophomore team is coached by seniors. Each Pull Team is named for the graduating year of that class. For example, the 19 (pronounced one-nine) Pull Team was composed entirely of students expected to graduate in 2019 plus the coaches expected to graduate in 2017 who were members of the 17 (one-seven) Pull Team. Teams that graduate in even years (such as 2018) are Even Year Pull Teams, whereas those who graduate in odd years are Odd Year Pull Teams. This year's contest features the sophomore 23 Pull Team, coached by the senior 21 Pull Team, against the freshmen 24 (pronounced two-four) Pull Team, coached by the junior 22 Pull Team.

History 
The first record of The Pull is a brief mention of a tug-of-war in Hope's newspaper, The Anchor in 1898. Between then and the first Pull with a recorded victor in 1909 there is no recorded history of The Pull or "the tug" as it was referred to then. The Pull was cancelled in 1918, 1943, and 1944 because of the First and Second World Wars. The Pull was cancelled once again for the first time in decades in 2020 due to the Covid-19 pandemic.  Methods of pulling have shifted greatly over the years. Pictures as early as 1927 show Pullers in pits similar to the way they look now, however pits were not consistent practice until the 1960s 

The precise strategy used from year-to-year changes fairly often, especially call sets (the moves by which the Pull Team uses to move in a synchronized manner). A new method is often desired to gain an edge over the opponent. There was a draw in 1916. In 1926, The Pull was again called a draw, and was settled by a basketball game, which the sophomore class of 1929 won. A third draw was called in 1952. 1956 saw the shortest Pull at 2 minutes and 40 seconds. The following year, 1957, The Pull was cancelled due to a campus-wide flu epidemic. The longest Pull was held in 1977 and lasted 3 hours and 51 minutes, to be called a draw. This was the last draw called. Following that grueling Pull, the constitution was re-written to what it currently is, allowing no more than 3 hours for one team to beat the other, requiring the rope gained to be measured at the 3 hour mark in order to determine the winner. The shortest Pull since these new rules was in 2008 when the 11 Pull Team took 71 feet of rope from the 12 Pull Team in only 67 minutes. The following year, the 12 Pull Team took a record 82 feet, 6 inches from the 13 Pull Team in 69 minutes. In 2013, a new rope was purchased by the college for The Pull.  In 2014 the 17 Pull team broke the all-time record for The Pull by taking 90 ft 4 in of rope from the freshman 18 team.

Rope Run and Pull Day
The day before The Pull itself, Pullers dig their pits into the ground to their own liking on the appropriate sides of the river. Afterwards, the teams meet together for what is known as Rope Run, which is a sort of "pep rally" in preparation for Pull. The Pullers line up in the same order as their respective pits, alternating between paired Even and Odd Years. The Rope Run can often get violent, as it puts opposed teams near one another at a time when emotions are running high. Coaches and alumni have been known to swear and spit as Pullers and Moralers jog around campus with the rope, chanting "Even Year, Odd Year" in a rhythmic battle cry of sorts. After Rope Run, each Pull Team gathers separately to do their respective chants and songs.

Pull begins promptly at 3 pm. Each team has 20 Pullers who each have their own Moralers. Moralers were once called "Morale Girls" but this was changed to allow more gender neutrality. There have been several female pullers and in 2021 the first male Moraler joined the team. As Pull is so physically and mentally straining, Moralers are important supporters in those respects. However, their key purpose is to act as the Pullers' eyes as they cannot see the Coach throwing the calls from their pits, and all 18 pits must move together for success. Even Year and Odd Year each have their own secretive methods for deciding the order in which Pullers may choose their Moralers. At the beginning of the event, the rope is marked at the front of Pit 1, so that a winner may be determined should it remain very close and that a margin of victory can be measured. While there are 20 pairs of Pullers and Moralers, there are only 18 pits. Each team has what are called "sprinters" and "marathoners". Each year has a strategy as to which pits they reserve for these special members of the teams. As the first half hour of Pull is both very crucial and very tiring, the sprinters are in these pits for that time. At the half hour mark, both of these pits are switched and the marathoners go in for the remainder of the Pull. There are doctors and judges on each side, and if it is deemed that someone must come off the rope, a sprinter or marathoner may take his or her place. Each side also has two more special pits, at the back of the team. The very last Puller is the "Anchor" and is typically the heaviest member of the team. The Anchor and his Moraler are the only members of the team who are standing for the entirety of Pull. In front of the anchor is "Pit 17" who will occasionally take on the Anchor's duties while the Anchor and his Moraler adjust the rope, and as such Pit 17 and his or her Moraler must be specially trained.

When the losing team has lost so much rope that they must move their Anchor into the pit in front of them to compensate, they then have 30 minutes to regain that pit. If they do not do so, The Pull is called, and the other team wins. During this last half hour, each team removes the large banner that originally blocked the view of the other team. Originally, the losing team was the team pulled into the river. Since then, the format of The Pull has changed and it has moved to a wider part of the river. Tradition now has the winners pulling the entirety of the rope onto their side of the river before jumping into the river and celebrating their victory as the losing team looks on from the riverbank.

Even Year versus Odd Year 
Since The Pull always places even graduation years in opposition to odd graduating years, a healthy rivalry has ensued between the two sets of years. Odd Year's colors are maroon and gold, while Even Year's are red, white, and black.

References

Hope College
Traditions by university or college in the United States
Tug of war